Lagana (from ) is a Greek flatbread traditionally baked for Clean Monday, the first day of the Great Lent. Traditionally, it was prepared unleavened (without the yeast), but leavened lagana is nowadays more common. It is typically flat, oval-shaped, with surface decorated by impressing fingertips.

Sesame seeds are a common topping, and it may also be topped with other herbs, and seasoned with olive oil.

See also
 Focaccia, a similar bread from Italian cuisine

Notes

Greek cuisine
Flatbreads
Eastern Orthodox Christian cuisine